Several ships have been named Liberty:

, an American Revolutionary War ship
, a merchant vessel launched at Broadstairs and burnt by the French navy at Montserrat in 1805.
 was of British origin, built in 1775, that first appeared as Liberty in 1787. She made six complete whale hunting voyages in the British Southern Whale Fishery before being lost in 1798 on her seventh voyage.
, a sternwheel steamboat (built in 1903), in Oregon, United States
, a large steam yacht built in 1903 for Joseph Pulitzer and later serving as a British hospital ship in World War I
, a United States Navy patrol vessel in commission from 1917 to 1919
, a United States Army cargo ship in commission from 1918 to 1942
, was a transport ship launched in June 1918 and decommissioned in May 1919, and as USAT Liberty, a United States Army transport ship sunk in 1942
, a US Navy electronic intelligence ship strafed and bombed by the Israeli airforce resulting in more than 34 dead and 171 wounded and its decommissioning as beyond repair.
The USS Liberty incident, in which Israel attacked the USS Liberty during the Six-Day War
, a 12-metre class yacht that unsuccessfully defended the America's Cup in 1983
Carnival Liberty, a Conquest class cruise ship operated by Carnival Cruise Line
 Liberty (Sausalito fireboat), see Sausalito, California

See also
Liberty ship, a class of US cargo ships mass-produced during World War II
List of Liberty ships

Ship names